State Route 224 (SR 224) was a state highway in the U.S. state of California that served as a spur route in Santa Barbara County from U.S. Route 101 in Carpinteria to Carpinteria State Beach. The route existed from 1964 to 1996.

Route description
The route ran from Route 101 at its junction with, and south on, Casitas Pass Road in Carpinteria.  Route 224 then turned west on Carpinteria Avenue before heading south along Palm Avenue, ending at Carpinteria State Beach.

History
In 1933, a road from Carpinteria to the state park was added to the state highway system. It was given the number of Route 152 in 1935. SR 224 was defined in the 1964 state highway renumbering. The route was deleted in 1996 by the California State Legislature.

Junction list

See also

References

External links

 Caltrans: Route 224 highway conditions

 California Highways: SR 224

224
State Route 224
Carpinteria, California